Thomas Joseph McCaffrey (21 December 1905 – 5 February 1975) was an Australian rules footballer who played with Fitzroy in the Victorian Football League (VFL).

McCaffrey later served in the Royal Australian Air Force during World War II.

Notes

External links 

1905 births
1975 deaths
Australian rules footballers from Victoria (Australia)
Fitzroy Football Club players